The Most Beautiful Woman in Paris is a 1928 German silent film directed by Jacob Fleck and Luise Fleck and starring Elga Brink, Werner Fuetterer, and Warwick Ward.

The film's sets were designed by the art director Franz Schroedter.

Cast
 Khawla El Arrak
 Werner Fuetterer
 Warwick Ward
 Rudolf Klein-Rogge
 Eugen Neufeld
 Alexandra Sorina
 Eva Speyer

References

Bibliography
 Bock, Hans-Michael & Bergfelder, Tim. The Concise CineGraph. Encyclopedia of German Cinema. Berghahn Books, 2009.

External links

1928 films
Films of the Weimar Republic
German silent feature films
1920s German-language films
Films directed by Luise Fleck
Films directed by Jacob Fleck
German black-and-white films
Films scored by Paul Dessau
Films based on Austrian novels
1920s German films